Cho Yong-ik (born 1934) is a South Korean artist. He was a leading figure in Korean abstract painting along with Kim Tschang Yeul, Park Seo-bo and Chung Sang-Hwa. He majored in art from Seoul National University and attended the Paris Biennale in 1961 and 1969 as one of Korea's delegates. His works are on exhibition in museums, including:the National Museum of Contemporary Art, Samsung Museum of Art, and Ho-Am Art Museum.

Personal history
1960 Jury member of Chosun Ilbo Contemporary Artists Exhibition

1958~1961 The chief of Contemporary Artists Association

1962 The chief of theActuell Committee

1965~1968 Jury member of Young Art Prize

1965~1981 Invited Professor at Seorabeol Art College (Present Chungang University)

1967 The Chief of I.S.P.A.A (International Society of Plastic and Audio – Visual Art)

1967~1969 5-6th Paris Biennale Korea Representative

1973~1979 Representative of Seoul ’70

1974~1992 Professor at Chugye University for the Arts

1974~1981 23-30th National Art Exhibition of Korea, The Recommended & Invited Artist

1977~1983 Korean Fine Arts Association Vice Executive Director

Solo exhibitions
1974 Shinsegae Gallery, Seoul

1984 Shinsegae Gallery, Seoul

1990 Arko Art Center, Seoul

2001 Jongno Gallery, Seoul

2008 Han Gallery, Seoul

2008 Geohong Gallery, Guri, Korea

2016 Sungkok Art Museum, Seoul

2016 Edouard Malingue Gallery, Hong Kong

Selected group exhibitions

1961  The 2nd Biennale de Paris, Paris, France 

1966  Contemporary Korean Painters Exhibition, Kuala Lumpur, Malaysia 

1967  Sao-Paulo International Biennial, Sao-Paulo, Brazil 

1980  Asia Contemporary Art Exhibition, Fukuoka Museum of Art, Fukuoka, Japan 

1983  Korea Contemporary Fine Art Exhibition, Viscontea Hall, Milano, Italy 

2015  Re:Contemporary- Fermented Souls, Waterfall mansion, New York, USA 

2016 Art Basel Hong kong, Edouard Malingue Gallery, Hong kong

Selected museum collections
National Museum of Modern & Contemporary Art

Gwangju Museum of Art

Seoul Museum

Walkerhill Museum

Samsung Museum of Art, Leeum

See also
 Dansaekhwa
 Monochrome painting
 Abstract expressionism

References

External links
 Edouard Malingue Gallery, Hong Kong gallery representing Cho Yong-Ik
 Cho Yong-ik official website

Living people
1934 births
Seoul National University alumni
Place of birth missing (living people)
20th-century South Korean painters
21st-century South Korean painters